Rabbit Lake is a small lake in the municipality of South Algonquin in Nipissing District, Ontario, Canada. It is part of the Saint Lawrence River drainage basin and lies in geographic Dickens Township. The lake empties via an unnamed creek to Aylen Lake, which flows via the Aylen River, Opeongo River, Madawaska River and Ottawa River to the Saint Lawrence River.

See also
List of lakes in Ontario

References

Other map sources:

Lakes of Nipissing District